
Palestine may refer to:
 State of Palestine, a state in Western Asia
 Palestine (region), a geographic region in Western Asia
 Palestinian territories, territories occupied by Israel since 1967, namely the West Bank (including East Jerusalem) and the Gaza Strip
 Palestinian enclaves, the areas designated for Palestinians under a variety of US and Israeli-led proposals
 Mandatory Palestine (1920–1948), a geopolitical entity under British administration
 Timeline of the name Palestine lists other historic uses

Other places

Canada 
 Palestine, Ontario

Iraq 
 Palestine Hotel, in Baghdad
 Palestine Street, in Baghdad

Saudi Arabia 
 Palestine Street, Jeddah

United Kingdom 
 Palestine, Hampshire, England
 Palestine Place, headquarters in London of the Church of England's organization Church's Ministry Among Jewish People

United States 
 Palestine, Arkansas
 Palestine, a community of Newtown, Connecticut
 Palestine, Illinois, in Crawford County
 Palestine Township, Woodford County, Illinois 
 New Palestine, Illinois
 Palestine, Indiana (disambiguation), several places
 Palestine Township, Story County, Iowa
 Palestine Township, Cooper County, Missouri
 Palestine, Ohio
 East Palestine, Ohio
 New Palestine, Ohio
 Palestine, Texas
 Lake Palestine, in Texas
 Palestine, Greenbrier County, West Virginia
 Palestine, Wirt County, West Virginia

Arts, entertainment and media
 Palestine (comics), a 2001 non-fiction graphic novel by Joe Sacco
 Palestine (2011 book), a 2011 compilation of statements by Ayatollah Ali Khamenei 
 Palestine (film), a 1912 American silent documentary
 Palestine (poem), by Reginald Heber, 1803
 New Palestine (magazine)

People 
 Charlemagne Palestine, American composer

Other uses 
 Palestine (horse), a racehorse who won the 2,000 Guineas in 1950
 Falastin (newspaper), 1911–1967

See also 

 All-Palestine Government, a Palestinian Arab state proclaimed by the Arab League in 1948 and seated in Egyptian-occupied Gaza Strip
 Definitions of Palestinian
 Holy Land
 Israel (disambiguation)
 Palestina (disambiguation)
 Palestinian (disambiguation)
 Palestinians
 Palestyna (disambiguation)
 Philistines
 Palestinian National Authority